Mostafa Kavakebian (born 18 March 1963) is an Iranian reformist politician and representative of Tehran at the Parliament of Iran. He has formerly represented Semnan and Mehdishahr in the parliament from 2008 until 2012.

Early life
Kavakebian was born in Semnan on 18 March 1963.

Career
Kavakebian is a leader of Democracy Party a reformist party that he founded in 2000. He was the leader of the 'Popular Reformist Coalition' that was running on 2004 and 2008 legislative election. He was a member of the reformist faction in the Parliament. He founded Popular Coalition of Supporters of Mir-Hossein Mousavi in the 2009 Iranian presidential election. Before he founded his party, he was the deputy leader of the 'Unity Party'. He is also the editor-in-chief of Mardomsalari newspaper. He was seeking to keep his seat in the 2012 election as leader of the Democratic Coalition of Reformists, but was not elected.

On 25 January 2013, his party nominated Kavakebian as a candidate for the presidential elections, which took place in June 2013.

On 25 April 2013, he held a press conference in Qom, and expressed his comments about the coming presidential election. He was registered for the election, but his bid was rejected by Guardian Council. He later supported Mohammad-Reza Aref in the election.

Following a successful campaign for parliament to represent a district in Tehran, he assumed office on 28 May 2016.

Electoral history

References

External links

http://drkv.ir

1963 births
Living people
Tarbiat Modares University alumni
Academic staff of the Islamic Azad University, Central Tehran Branch
People from Semnan, Iran
Iranian democracy activists
Democracy Party (Iran) politicians
Members of the 10th Islamic Consultative Assembly
Members of the 8th Islamic Consultative Assembly
Islamic Iran Solidarity Party politicians
Iranian newspaper publishers (people)
Islamic Republican Party politicians
Secretaries-General of political parties in Iran
Imam Sadiq University alumni